Patsy Vatlet is a Belgian politician who was elected as a Member of the European Parliament in 2019 but did not take her seat. She was replaced by Tom Vandendriessche.

References

21st-century Belgian women politicians
21st-century Belgian politicians
Living people
Year of birth missing (living people)